Abaco National Park is a national park in South Abaco, the Abaco Islands, the Bahamas.

Flora and fauna
The park contains  of pine forest; Caribbean pine. Avian wildlife at the park includes the Bahama parrot, Bahama swallow, Bahama yellowthroat, Bahama mockingbird, loggerhead kingbird, olive-capped warbler, West Indian woodpecker and the white-crowned pigeon.

References

National parks of the Bahamas
Abaco Islands